Ann Mary Gwynne Grant (née Fletcher; born May 6, 1955) is a former field hockey player from Zimbabwe, who captained the national team that won the gold medal at the 1980 Summer Olympics in Moscow.

Because of a boycott by western European, Australasian and other countries, the Women's Field Hockey Tournament contained fewer teams than normal. A late request was sent to the government of Zimbabwe, which quickly assembled a team less than a week before the competition started. To everyone's surprise they won, claiming Zimbabwe's only medal in the 1980 Games. Grant captained the team.

Grant is the sister of former Zimbabwe cricketer and India cricket coach Duncan Fletcher.

References

External links
 

1955 births
Living people
Sportspeople from Harare
Zimbabwean female field hockey players
Olympic field hockey players of Zimbabwe
Field hockey players at the 1980 Summer Olympics
Olympic gold medalists for Zimbabwe
Olympic medalists in field hockey
Medalists at the 1980 Summer Olympics
White Zimbabwean sportspeople